The Great Gatsby is a 2000 British-American romantic drama television film, based on the 1925 novel of the same name by F. Scott Fitzgerald. It was directed by Robert Markowitz, written by John J. McLaughlin, and stars Toby Stephens in the title role of Jay Gatsby, Mira Sorvino as Daisy Buchanan, Paul Rudd as Nick Carraway, Martin Donovan as Tom Buchanan, Francie Swift as Jordan Baker, Heather Goldenhersh as Myrtle Wilson, and Matt Malloy as Klipspringer. The film aired on March 29, 2000 in the United Kingdom on BBC, and on January 14, 2001 in the United States on A&E.

Hampered by a limited budget of $5 million and hastily filmed in Montreal, Canada, in order to reduce costs, this A&E television adaptation suffered from low production values, and the critical response upon its broadcast release was overwhelmingly negative. The New York Times dismissed it as "flat-footed," The Guardian described it as "uninspired," and The Boston Globe savaged it as "mediocre". The performances of Toby Stephens as Jay Gatsby and Mira Sorvino as Daisy Buchanan were particularly ill-received by a number of critics, although Paul Rudd's performance as Nick Carraway received positive acclaim.

Plot 
Nick Carraway is a young bond salesman who rents a cottage on Long Island, New York, near the mansion of the wealthy and reclusive Jay Gatsby. Nick gets to know Gatsby, who was a poor man named Gatz before he left to fight in World War I. Gatsby fell in love with a beautiful woman from a wealthy family, Daisy. When he returned, Gatz was determined to prove himself worthy to win her hand, even though Daisy had by this time married the socially prominent Tom Buchanan. Gatsby has yet to give up on his romantic dream and enlists Nick, who is distantly related to Daisy, in his plan.

Cast 

 Paul Rudd as Nick CarrawayA Yale graduate and World War I veteran from the Midwest. Working as a bond salesman after the war, Carraway moves to West Egg to live near his cousin Daisy Buchanan. In West Egg, Carraway meets his next door neighbour, none other than the movie’s main character, Jay Gatsby. In awe of Gatsby's wealth, history, and lifestyle, Carraway befriends him and immediately becomes even more intrigued with his mysterious neighbor.
 Toby Stephens as Jay GatsbyOriginally born James “Jimmy” Gatz from North Dakota, Gatsby was a major in World War I where he first fell in love with Daisy Buchanan. However being poor and not from a patrician family, Daisy was married to another man, Tom Buchanan. From this point on, Gatsby dedicated to making his life into one suitable enough for Daisy and be able to finally win her love. From being a soldier to a businessman, with his new riches, Gatsby buys a mansion in West Egg directly across the water from Daisy’s home in order to keep a watchful eye on the love of his life. Gatsby is known for throwing elaborate and extravagant parties at his mansion in hopes that one day Daisy might show up and he would be able to win her back with his immense new wealth. Fitzgerald based the character on bootlegger and former World War I officer, Max Gerlach. A military veteran, Gerlach became a self-made millionaire due to his bootlegging endeavors and was fond of using the phrase "old sport" in his letters to Fitzgerald.
  Mira Sorvino as Daisy BuchananA warm, flirtatious, and selfish married woman from South Kentucky. Daisy’s character is married to a man named Tom Buchanan and they have one daughter together. Being cousins with Nick Carraway who is slowly developing a new friendship with Jay Gatsby, Daisy Buchanan is reunited with her former lover none other than Gatsby himself. Her reunion with Gatsby arouses the jealousy and suspicion of her husband. Fitzgerald based the character on Chicago socialite and heiress Ginevra King.
 Martin Donovan as Tom BuchananThe husband of Daisy Buchanan. Unlike Jay Gatsby, Thomas Buchanan's family background and riches were enough to win over Daisy and marry her. Despite his relationship with Daisy, Tom becomes involved in an extramarital affair with Myrtle Wilson. Buchanan has certain parallels with William "Bill" Mitchell, the Chicago businessman who married Ginevra King. Buchanan and Mitchell were both Chicagoans with an interest in polo. Also, like Ginevra's father Charles King whom Fitzgerald resented, Buchanan is an imperious Yale man and polo player from Lake Forest, Illinois.
 Francie Swift as Jordan BakerComing from Louisville, the character of Jordan Baker plays the main love interest of Nick Carraway. It is also revealed that she had a past with Daisy Buchanan and was aware of her whole love affair, past and present, with Jay Gatsby. Fitzgerald based Jordan on Ginevra King's friend Edith Cummings, a premier amateur golfer known in the press as "The Fairway Flapper".
 Heather Goldenhersh as Myrtle WilsonThe impoverished wife of a car mechanic and garage owner. She desires to be sophisticated and wealthy, coming off as tacky to the narrator Nick Carraway. Being unhappily married to her husband for two years now due to his lack of wealth and social status, Myrtle has an affair with Tom Buchanan.

Production 
Initially planned to be shot in Ottawa, the production ended up shooting in Montreal, Quebec, as Ottawa was not equipped to handle the production on short notice. The television film was shot in less than thirty days in September 1999 with a budget of $5 million. The film was made in collaboration by the A&E Cable Network in the United States, and Granada Productions in Great Britain. It was directed by Robert Markowitz from a teleplay by John J. McLaughlin. The music score was by Carl Davis and the cinematography by Guy Dufaux. The production was designed by Taavo Soodor.

Marketing 
A&E Network launched a widespread marketing campaign for their 2001 programming, with a major focus on The Great Gatsby. For Gatsby, they hosted national and local sweepstakes sponsored by US Airways and Waterford Crystal and tied them into high schools, colleges, and libraries. Displays were reportedly placed in 12,000 libraries nationwide, and A&E held acting contests at 23,000 high schools and colleges. An in-flight featurette, The Making of the Great Gatsby, played on US Airways during the holiday season.

Reception 
The Great Gatsby television adaptation received negative reviews upon its broadcast debut. On Rotten Tomatoes, the film holds a 27% approval rating, and on IMDb it has a score of 5.7/10. The New York Times dismissed it as "flat-footed," The Guardian described it as "uninspired," and The Boston Globe savaged it as "mediocre". In his review in The Boston Globe, critic Matthew Gilbert described the film as a crass attempt by "television execs hoping to mine yet another literary classic for its built-in audience."

Caryn James of the New York Times praised Paul Rudd as "brilliant" in the role of Nick Carraway, but dismissed the film as disappointing and wrote the "film might have survived its pedestrian style, but it can't survive a leaden Gatsby." In her review, James criticized Toby Stephens' performance as "so rough around the edges, so patently an up-from-the-street poseur that no one could fall for his stories for a second" and his "blunt performance turns Gatsby's entrancing smile into a suspicious smirk".

Mira Sorvino's performance as Daisy Buchanan was roundly criticized. Natasha Joffe of The Guardian wrote that Sorvino was an abysmal Daisy "whose voice is supposed to be full of money, but is just moany. Why would Gatsby love her? She looks like a drowned goose and her hats are like they've been made out of old pants." Similarly, John Crook of The Fremont Tribune wrote that Sorvino was "seriously miscast as Daisy".

References

Citations

Works cited

External links 
 
 Ratings at RottenTomatoes.com

2000 films
2000 romantic drama films
2000s American films
2000s British films
2000s English-language films
A&E (TV network) original films
American drama television films
American romantic drama films
BBC Film films
British drama television films
British romantic drama films
Films based on The Great Gatsby
Films directed by Robert Markowitz
Films scored by Carl Davis
Films shot in Montreal
Romance television films
Television films based on books